Yann André LeCun (originally spelled Le Cun; born 8 July 1960) is a French computer scientist working primarily in the fields of machine learning, computer vision, mobile robotics and computational neuroscience. He is the Silver Professor of the Courant Institute of Mathematical Sciences at New York University and Vice-President, Chief AI Scientist at Meta.

He is well known for his work on optical character recognition and computer vision using convolutional neural networks (CNN), and is a founding father of convolutional nets. He is also one of the main creators of the DjVu image compression technology (together with Léon Bottou and Patrick Haffner). He co-developed the Lush programming language with Léon Bottou.

LeCun received the 2018 Turing Award (often referred to as "Nobel Prize of Computing"), together with Yoshua Bengio and Geoffrey Hinton, for their work on deep learning.
The three are sometimes referred to as the "Godfathers of AI" and "Godfathers of Deep Learning".

Life 

Yann LeCun was born at Soisy-sous-Montmorency in the suburbs of Paris in 1960. His name was originally spelled Le Cun from the old Breton form Le Cunff and was from the region of Guingamp in northern Brittany. "Yann" is the Breton form for "John". He received a Diplôme d'Ingénieur from the ESIEE Paris in 1983 and a PhD in Computer Science from Université Pierre et Marie Curie (today Sorbonne University) in 1987 during which he proposed an early form of the back-propagation learning algorithm for neural networks.

In 1988, he joined the Adaptive Systems Research Department at AT&T Bell Laboratories in Holmdel, New Jersey, United States, headed by Lawrence D. Jackel, where he developed a number of new machine learning methods, such as a biologically inspired model of image recognition called convolutional neural networks, the "Optimal Brain Damage" regularisation methods, and the Graph Transformer Networks method (similar to conditional random field), which he applied to handwriting recognition and OCR. The bank check recognition system that he helped develop was widely deployed by NCR and other companies, reading over 10% of all the checks in the US in the late 1990s and early 2000s.

In 1996, he joined AT&T Labs-Research as head of the Image Processing Research Department, which was part of Lawrence Rabiner's Speech and Image Processing Research Lab, and worked primarily on the DjVu image compression technology, used by many websites, notably the Internet Archive, to distribute scanned documents. His collaborators at AT&T include Léon Bottou and Vladimir Vapnik.

After a brief tenure as a Fellow of the NEC Research Institute (now NEC-Labs America) in Princeton, NJ, he joined New York University (NYU) in 2003, where he is Silver Professor of Computer Science Neural Science at the Courant Institute of Mathematical Sciences and the Center for Neural Science. He is also a professor at the Tandon School of Engineering. At NYU, he has worked primarily on Energy-Based Models for supervised and unsupervised learning, feature learning for object recognition in Computer Vision, and mobile robotics.

In 2012, he became the founding director of the NYU Center for Data Science. On 9 December 2013, LeCun became the first director of Meta AI Research in New York City, and stepped down from the NYU-CDS directorship in early 2014.

In 2013, he and Yoshua Bengio co-founded the International Conference on Learning Representations, which adopted a post-publication open review process he previously advocated on his website. He was the chair and organiser of the "Learning Workshop" held every year between 1986 and 2012 in Snowbird, Utah. He is a member of the Science Advisory Board of the Institute for Pure and Applied Mathematics at UCLA. He is the Co-Director of the Learning in Machines and Brain research program (formerly Neural Computation & Adaptive Perception) of CIFAR.

In 2016, he was the visiting professor of computer science on the "Chaire Annuelle Informatique et Sciences Numériques" at Collège de France in Paris. His "leçon inaugurale" (inaugural lecture) was an important event in 2016 Paris intellectual life.

Awards and honours 
LeCun is a member of the US National Academy of Sciences, National Academy of Engineering and the French Académie des Sciences.

He has received honorary doctorates from IPN in Mexico City in 2016, from EPFL in 2018 and from Université Côte d'Azur in 2021
In March 2019, LeCun won the Turing award, sharing it with Yoshua Bengio and Geoffrey Hinton.

He received the IEEE Neural Network Pioneer Award in 2014 and the PAMI Distinguished Researcher Award. in 2015.
In September 2019, he received the Golden Plate Award of the American Academy of Achievement.
In 2018 LeCun was awarded the IRI Medal, established by the Industrial Research Institute (IRI).
In 2022 he received the Princess of Asturias Award in the category "Scientific Research", along with Yoshua Bengio, Geoffrey Hinton and Demis Hassabis.

In 2017, LeCun declined an invitation to lecture at the King Abdullah University of Science and Technology in Saudi Arabia because he believed he would be considered a terrorist in the country in view of his atheism.
In September 2018, he received the Harold Pender Award given by the University of Pennsylvania.

References

External links 
 Yann LeCun's personal website
 Yann LeCun's lab website at NYU
 Yann LeCun's website at Collège de France
 Yann LeCun's List of PhD Students
 Yann LeCun's publications
  Convolutional Neural Networks
 DjVuLibre website
 Lush website
 AMA: Yann LeCun (self.MachineLearning) www.reddit.com Ask Me Anything : Yann LeCun
 IEEE Spectrum Article
 Technology Review article

1960 births
Living people
Artificial intelligence researchers
Machine learning researchers
Computer vision researchers
French atheists
French roboticists
French computer scientists
American atheists
American computer scientists
Scientists at Bell Labs
French emigrants to the United States
Free software programmers
Pierre and Marie Curie University alumni
American roboticists
Polytechnic Institute of New York University faculty
Courant Institute of Mathematical Sciences faculty
Turing Award laureates
Fellows of the Association for the Advancement of Artificial Intelligence
Members of the United States National Academy of Sciences
People from Soisy-sous-Montmorency
Academic staff of the Collège de France
French people of Breton descent
American people of Breton descent